Nadezhdy Island is a bare rock island nearly  long, lying just off the north-central side of Schirmacher Hills, Queen Maud Land. First photographed from the air by the German Antarctic Expedition, 1938–39. Mapped by the Soviet Antarctic Expedition in 1961 and named Ostrov Nadezhdy (Hope Island).

See also 
 List of antarctic and sub-antarctic islands

Islands of Queen Maud Land
Princess Astrid Coast